The Alicante Tram, trademarked as Alicante Metropolitan TRAM, operates in the Spanish city of Alicante (Valencian Community) and its surrounding area. Like other narrow gauge railways in the Valencian Community, it is run by Ferrocarrils de la Generalitat Valenciana (FGV). It was inaugurated on 15 August 2003 replacing narrow-gauge diesel trains between Alicante and El Campello.

The Alicante Metropolitan Tram light rail combines different modes of rail services: a partially underground modern tramway through Alicante city centre, a tram-train from Alicante to Benidorm, and conventional commuter rail from Benidorm to Altea, Calp and Dénia.

History 
There has been a rich history of urban rail service in Alicante. The tram service began on 13 July 1893 and the network was rapidly expanding to Mutxamel (1902), Elche and Crevillent (1905) and San Vicente del Raspeig (1906).  Initially, the streetcars were horse-drawn. Since 1903 the trams were carried as well by the power of steam engine, leading to the disappearance of the horse-drawn trams by 1924. The electrification of tram lines began in 1923. In 1920s and 30s the network was further expanded throughout the city and was extensively used in 1940s. In 1950s, due to high costs of electricity, trams were gradually losing the competition against growing automobile services and by 14 November 1969 they completely disappeared from the streets. Thirty years later, on 13 March 1999 the trams were back with the inauguration of an experimental route between Plaza del Mar and Albufereta that was extended to El Campello in 2003.

Lines 

The network comprises the following lines:

Notes: What is now L3 was opened initially in 1999 as an experimental service between Porta del Mar and Albufereta, and was extended to El Campello in 2003. L9 was originally taken over by FGV in 1987, and was incorporated into the tram network upon its opening.

L1 is a limited-stop service from Alicante city centre to Benidorm taking 70 minutes journey time. In Benidorm it connects with line L9 to Denia.

L2 starts from the city centre to the General Hospital of Alicante, the University of Alicante and San Vicente del Raspeig, with a journey time of 28 minutes.

L3 is a stopping service from Alicante to El Campello.

L4 runs from the city centre to a loop in Playa de San Juan district.

L5 starts at Porta del Mar to Sangueta, then following the L4 loop in Playa de San Juan district. It was opened in 2019, using former alignment from Porta del Mar and Sangueta that was used prior to the opening of the city centre tunnel to Luceros.

L9 is diesel powered commuter rail service from Benidorm along the coast to Denia, stopping at other important tourist towns like Altea and Calp. Services are subject to disruption due to engineering works as the line is prepared for electrification.

Lines L1, L2, L3 and L4 share the city centre underground section between MARQ and the city centre Luceros station. The Mercado station on the segment was opened on 10 May 2007 and the Luceros was opened on 18 June 2010.

In 2022, the network served more than 13 million passengers. The busiest stations were Luceros (2,110,810 passengers), Mercado (1,367,514), Benidorm (731,051), San Vicente del Raspeig (686,983) and El Campello (540,622).

Future expansion 

The underground section is planned to continue westward to Estación Multimodal serving the Adif station (and a possible relocation of the bus station). This was originally delayed, but in April 2022 President of the Valencian Government Ximo Puig committed funds to progress this extension.

On the other hand, there are plans to extend the tram-train service in different places:
 New Line 6, from Estación Intermodal to Hospital of San Vicente del Raspeig
 New line to the neighborhoods in the south of the city
 New line to San Juan and Muchamiel
 New line between Torrevieja and Orihuela
 New line between Elche and the Airport

Gallery 

Underground Stations

Ground Stations

See also 
 Premetro

Notes

References

External links 

 Tram Alicante official website (English)

Alicante
Light rail in Spain
Transport in the Valencian Community
Regional rail in Spain